XD, sometimes stylized as xD, is an emoticon commonly used to symbolize laughter. It represents two closed eyes with the X and mouth with the D, as in the emoji: 🤣 or 😆. It may also refer to:

Arts and entertainment
Disney XD, a global television brand aimed at younger children
 Pokémon XD: Gale of Darkness, a video game for the Nintendo GameCube

Technology
 Adobe XD, a user experience design software developed by Adobe Systems
 XD bit (or NX bit), a security-related computer technology for x86 and x64 processors
 XDCAM, a professional video disc format
 xD-Picture Card, an obsolete flash memory card format
 Extreme Digital Cinema, by Century Theatres
 User experience design (UXD, UED, or XD), process of enhancing user satisfaction with a product

Vehicles
 Ford XD Falcon, an Australian built family car between 1979 and 1982
 Scion xD, a subcompact hatchback sold by Toyota's youth-oriented division Scion
 DOK-ING XD, a future Croatian electric city car made by DOK-ING
 New Flyer XD40 and XD60, model numbers for its Xcelsior transit bus family
 Defender XD (extra duty), a model of Land Rover Defender
 Hyundai Avante XD, a name for the 3rd Generation of Hyundai Elantra (XD Series) (South Korea)

Other uses
 Independence Party (Iceland) (xD)
 Springfield Armory XD, a line of semi-automatic pistols marketed by Springfield Armory
 Spanish-language Internet slang for "por Dios", a rough equivalent to "OMG" in English